Alfred Nyambane (born 15 June 1956) is a Kenyan sprinter. He competed in the men's 200 metres at the 1984 Summer Olympics.

References

1956 births
Living people
Athletes (track and field) at the 1984 Summer Olympics
Kenyan male sprinters
Olympic athletes of Kenya
Place of birth missing (living people)